Bitter Creek is a 1954 American Western film directed by Thomas Carr and starring Bill Elliott, Carleton Young, and Beverly Garland. The screenplay concerns a man who sets out to personally avenge the murder of his rancher brother.

Plot

Cast
 Bill Elliott as Clay Tyndall 
 Carleton Young as Quentin Allen  
 Beverly Garland as Gail Bonner  
 Claude Akins as Vance Morgan - Henchman  
 Jim Hayward as Dr. Prentiss  
 John Harmon as A.Z. Platte - Stagecoach Driver  
 Veda Ann Borg as Whitey  
 Danny Mummert as Jerry Bonner 
 John Pickard as Oak Mason - Henchman  
 Forrest Taylor as Harley Pruett  
 Dabbs Greer as Sheriff  
 Mike Ragan as Joe Venango - Henchman  
 Zon Murray as Henchman  
 John Larch as Hired Gunman  
 Joe Devlin as Pat - Bartender  
 Earle Hodgins as Charles Hammond 
 Florence Lake as Mrs. Hammond  
 Jane Easton as  Oak's Girlfriend

References

Further reading
 Pitts, Michael R. Western Movies: A Guide to 5,105 Feature Films. McFarland, 2012.

External links

1954 films
1954 Western (genre) films
American Western (genre) films
Films directed by Thomas Carr
Allied Artists films
Films scored by Raoul Kraushaar
American black-and-white films
1950s English-language films
1950s American films